Dayvon Daquan Bennett (August 9, 1994 – November 6, 2020), known professionally as King Von, was an American rapper from Chicago, Illinois. He was signed to Lil Durk's record label Only the Family and Empire Distribution.

Bennett gained notoriety from singles Crazy Story and Took Her to the O, which reached the forty-fourth position of the Billboard Hot 100, and for the studio album Welcome to O'Block, which placed fifth on the Billboard 200.

Early life 
Bennett was born on August 9, 1994, in Chicago, Illinois. He had six half-siblings from his father, Walter E. Bennett, and three siblings from his mother, Taesha. He was raised mostly by his mother; his relationship with his father was inconsistent due to his father's incarcerations. When Von was 11 years old his father was killed by gunfire. Von would later pay tribute to his father in multiple songs.

At age 16, Von went to jail for the first time. In 2014, he was charged with one count of first degree murder and two counts of attempted murder in connection with a shooting that killed one and injured two others. After being acquitted of all charges, Von began focusing on his music career, collaborating with Lil Durk. Before his arrest for the charges, he attended South Suburban College in South Holland, Illinois. He earned his GED while in juvenile detention. During this time, he joined the Black Disciples street gang.

Career 
After fellow rapper Lil Durk signed King Von to his Only the Family (Originally known as Only Trey Folks) label, Von released his single Crazy Story on December 6, 2018, and it became his breakout single.

On Valentine's Day 2019, Von's girlfriend, rapper Asian Doll, released a music video for her track about the artist, Grandson, in which Von appeared.

In May 2019, Crazy Story 2.0 featuring Lil Durk was released, and a subsequent music video was later released on May 20, 2021, and peaked at number four on the Bubbling Under Hot 100 chart. On September 13, 2019, a third rendition of the single called Crazy Story, Pt. 3 was released. On July 9, 2019, Lil Durk and King Von released their collaborative single Like That. On September 2, 2019, Von released his single What It's Like. The single then appeared on his album Grandson, Vol. 1.

On September 19, 2019, Von released his 15 track mixtape, Grandson, Vol. 1, featuring Lil Durk on a pair of tracks. The album debuted at number 75 on the Billboard 200 and number 27 on the Hip Hop/R&B albums chart. On November 16, 2019, Von released his single 2 A.M. On November 29, 2019, Von released his single Rollin featuring YNW Melly, accompanied with a music video.
Nugget one of his most popular songs. It was included on his mixtape, Levon James, released on March 6, 2020, which peaked at number 63 on the Billboard 200. The album features verses from NLE Choppa, Tee Grizzley, G Herbo, Lil Durk, and YNW Melly, among others.

On April 29, 2020, King Von released his single Grandson for President. He followed the single up closely with a music video release for Broke Opps, a song from Levon James. He then released another single, titled "Why He Told" on July 27, 2020, and followed that up with another popular single, All These Niggas, featuring Chicago rapper Lil Durk, which garnered  great success on YouTube. He then released another single, titled How It Go, on August 26, 2020.

On October 9, 2020, King Von released I Am What I Am, featuring New York rapper Fivio Foreign. This release was in anticipation of his debut studio album Welcome to O'Block, released on October 29, 2020. The 16-track album features production Chopsquad DJ, Tay Keith, Wheezy and Hitmaka, among others. The album includes the Polo G collaboration The Code, which was released with a music video. 
After his death, his team releases the music videos for Wayne's Story, Armed & Dangerous, Mine Too and finally Demon, This piece in particular was Von's favorite all over the album.

On December 24, 2020, Lil Durk released his album The Voice as a tribute to King Von, who appears on the album cover and on the song, Still Trappin'.

On March 4, 2022, King Von's management team released his first posthumous album, What It Means to Be King. It peaked at number one on the Billboard 200.
Shortly thereafter, the music videos for two excerpts from his discs were released; the accompanying video to his song Too Real was released on his birthday, August 9, 2022.

Personal life 
Bennett was in an on-and-off relationship with Texas rapper Asian Doll, but the two were reportedly not in a relationship at the time of his death. Bennet had three children, one son (whom he had with Doll), and two daughters.

Legal issues 
On November 21, 2012, Bennett was arrested and booked into Cook County jail for unlawful possession of a firearm.

On July 24, 2014, Bennett was arrested in connection with a shooting in May 2014, resulting in the death of Malcolm Stuckey and the injury of two other men. Bennett was charged with 1 count of murder and 2 counts of attempted murder. The shooting took place in Englewood, Chicago. After witnesses failed to testify in 2017, the charges were dropped.

In June 2019, Bennett and fellow rapper Lil Durk were arrested in connection with a shooting in Atlanta. Bennett and his co-defendant Banks appeared before a judge in a Fulton County courtroom for a probable cause hearing. Prosecutors claimed that the two rappers robbed and shot Alexander Witherspoon outside a popular drive-in on February 5, 2019. After weeks in jail, Durk was released on a $250,000 bond, while Von was released from a $300,000 bond.

In July 2021, the Chicago Police released documents concluding that Bennett was responsible for the fatal shooting of 17-year-old Gangster Disciples member Gakirah "K.I." Barnes in April 2014, but were unable to prosecute him due to inconsistencies in witness statements.

Death 
On November 6, 2020, at around 2:15 a.m., Bennett and his crew were involved in an altercation with Quando Rondo's crew outside of the Monaco hookah lounge in Atlanta, Georgia. The dispute quickly escalated into gunfire, and Bennett was shot multiple times. He was transported to a hospital in critical condition and died there later that day. He was 26 years old.

The Georgia Bureau of Investigation reported that two people were killed and six wounded. One of them was placed in police custody for the murder of King Von while being treated for a gunshot wound. The suspect was identified as Timothy Leeks, aged 22, a rapper also known as Lul Timm who is affiliated with Quando Rondo.

On November 14, 2020, King Von was buried in Chicago, Illinois.

Remembrance 
During the 64th Annual Grammy Awards, Bennett was included in the In Memoriam montage.

In August 2021, a mural depicting King Von was painted by artist Chris Devins, in Parkway Gardens, Chicago (where Von was from). It was meant to serve as a tribute to the late rapper. The mural was seen as controversial amongst Chicago residents – some of them argued that it would attract gang-related crime to the area, and that it was a glorification of gang violence.

Discography

Mixtapes 
 Grandson, Vol. 1 (2019)
 Levon James (2020)

Studio albums 
 Welcome to O'Block (2020)
 What It Means to Be King (2022)

See also 
 List of murdered hip hop musicians

References

External links 

 
 
  
 

1994 births
2020 deaths
African-American male rappers
Drill musicians
Gangsta rappers
Hyde Park Academy High School alumni
Midwest hip hop musicians
Rappers from Chicago
21st-century American rappers
American hip hop singers
Deaths by firearm in Georgia (U.S. state)
21st-century American male singers
21st-century American singers
21st-century African-American musicians
Murdered African-American people